Scott Guthrie is Executive Vice President of the Cloud and AI group in Microsoft.

He leads the teams that deliver Microsoft Azure, Dynamics 365, Visual Studio, Visual Studio Code, GitHub, .NET, Hololens, Microsoft SQL Server, Power BI and Power Apps.

Guthrie graduated with a degree in computer science from Duke University. Following this, he joined Microsoft in 1997. He frequently presents wearing a signature red shirt  and speaks at many of the major Microsoft conferences.

He is also known for his work on ASP.NET, which he and colleague Mark Anders developed while at Microsoft.

References

External links 
 
 ScottGu's Blog

American computer programmers
ASP.NET
Duke University alumni
Living people
Microsoft employees
Microsoft Windows people
1975 births